Buziak is a surname of Polish origin, prevalent in the United States and Canada.

Notable people with this surname include:
 Bob Buziak, president of RCA Records
 Helen Buziak, victim in the Our Lady of the Angels School fire
 Lindsay Buziak (1983–2008), Canadian murder victim
 Paulina Buziak (born 1986), Polish race walker

References